The animated television series Totally Spies! follows the adventures of three Beverly Hills teenage girls—Sam, Clover, and Alex—who work as secret agents on missions to save the world, involving real locations and some fictional ones. The series comprises six seasons divided into 156 episodes. Framing each episode is a side story in which the girls deal with high school life and its situations. Most of the episodes are self-contained. In season 3, also titled Totally Spies! Undercover, the three girls share a villa, and at the end of that season, they are promoted to super spies in the organization and are referred to as such for season 4. Season 5 follows the girls' adventures as they continue onto university.

Totally Spies! premiered on November 3, 2001, on ABC Family (now Freeform). It later premiered in Europe on channels such as Germany's ProSieben, France's TF1 and the United Kingdom's Channel 4 during the spring of 2002. The show was moved to Cartoon Network on July 7, 2003 where it enjoyed much success, and continued airing for a total of five seasons until 2009. It spawned a feature film Totally Spies! The Movie and a spin-off series The Amazing Spiez!.
In 2013, the show was revived for a sixth season, premiering at an event at the Palace of Versailles. Twenty-six episodes were broadcast on French television and networks across Europe starting in 4 September 2013. In Canada, the sixth season premiered on September 7, 2014 on Teletoon, and on September 6 on sister station Télétoon. The show has been broadcast worldwide on various networks, including TF1 in France, Teletoon in Canada, Cartoon Network in the US and Latin America, Rede Globo in Brazil, Disney Channel and Nickelodeon in Asia, Africa, and Europe (formerly Fox Kids and Jetix).The head writers for the show were Robert and Michelle Lamoreaux who were based in Los Angeles, and who had worked on Nickelodeon shows. The theme song for the first two seasons is "Here We Go" by Moonbaby (Miranda Cooper and Brian Higgins), but with lyrics changed slightly to fit the show. Seasons 3–5 use the same song but as instrumentals. During the closing credits of seasons 3–4, one of the girls, or occasionally Jerry or Mandy, talks directly to the camera about random topics which sometimes are tied to the episode theme. The sixth season uses a different theme song.

A seventh season is in development, and it is slated to be released in 2024.

Series overview

Episodes

Season 1 (2001–02)

Season 2 (2002–04)

Season 3 (2004–05) 
Season 3 was broadcast on TF1 in France, on Teletoon in Canada, on Cartoon Network and Animania HD in the United States and otherwise internationally in 2004–2005.

Season 4 (2005–07) 
Season 4 first aired in 2005, in HD on the Voom's Animania HD channel in the United States before it premiered on TF1 in France, on Teletoon in Canada, on Cartoon Network in United States and otherwise internationally in 2006–2007.

Season 5 (2007–08) 
Season 5 was broadcast on TF1 in France, on Teletoon in Canada, on Animania HD in the United States and otherwise internationally in 2007–2008, then later broadcast on Cartoon Network in 2010. It was the last season to be shown in 16:9 high-definition on the Voom's Animania HD channel before it ceased operations in 2009.

Season 6 (2013–14) 
The sixth season of Totally Spies! was announced by French television network TF1 in an online article back in 2011 and premiered in September 4, 2013 in France. It was the first season to be produced and broadcast in 16:9 high-definition.

Season 7 (2024)
This season is slated to broadcast in 2024 and is to be co-produced by Gulli, Ollenom of Monello Production, and Discovery Kids Latin America.

See also 
 Totally Spies!
 Totally Spies! The Movie

Notes

References

External links 
United States Copyright Office Copyright Catalog (1978 to present) – includes information on the first 52 episodes

Lists of Canadian children's animated television series episodes
Lists of French animated television series episodes
Totally Spies!